Aloha from Hawaii via Satellite is a live album by American singer and musician Elvis Presley, released by RCA Records in February 1973. The album consists of recordings from Presley's January 1973 concert of the same name. It peaked at #1 on the Billboard chart in the spring of the same year. Despite the satellite innovation, the concert did not air in the United States until April 4. Aloha from Hawaii (which was a worldwide ratings smash) went to #1 on the Billboard album chart. The album dominated the charts, reaching #1 in both the pop and country charts in the US.

The album was certified Gold on February 13, 1973, platinum and 2× Platinum on May 20, 1988, 3× Platinum on July 15, 1999, and 5× Platinum on August 1, 2002, by the RIAA. On April 15, 2016, the BPI certified the album Silver for sales of 60,000 units.

Content
Aloha from Hawaii is a two-disc set—only the second such release of Presley's career (the first being 1969's double set From Memphis to Vegas/From Vegas to Memphis, which contained one album each of studio and concert recordings). It was initially released only in quadraphonic sound, becoming the first album in the format to top the Billboard album chart. After Quadrophonic sound failed to catch on, RCA issued a standard stereophonic version of the album.

The album contains all the live performances from the TV special, of which, eight of the songs had previously been recorded by Presley at various times, but had never before been released, as a sticker on the album cover announced. The album omits the five songs Presley recorded after the show and which were featured on the original broadcast; these would be issued later on the album Mahalo from Elvis. The album also omits Presley's brief announcement concerning the concert being presented for the benefit of the Kui Lee Cancer Fund.

This is the penultimate live album that Presley released during his lifetime, the last being Elvis Recorded Live on Stage in Memphis the following year. (Later soundtracks for the TV special Elvis in Concert and the documentary This Is Elvis were released posthumously).

Regarding the 1973 Aloha From Hawaii Elvis Presley "Chicken Of The Sea" RCA 33rpm LP 
After extensive research and contacts with the Van Camp company, it was ascertained that the latter never released any promotional sticker intended to be affixed on the shrink-wrap of the April 1973 U.S. edition RCA Victor VPSX-6089 neither directly pasted on picture sleeves of same release. Such Chicken Of The Sea stickers were an historical fake (bogus) made among the Elvis' collecting circle in order to create the rarity and push up the prices for such memorabilia marketplace.

The Van Camp Company San Diego office has also advised that nothing exists in their files as evidence to support the printing of such promotional stickers and nothing exists that they were intended as promotional merchandise for their employees.

Track listing

Original LP release

CD reissue
The following tracks were recorded by Presley after the concert and inserted into the broadcast with the exception of  "No More", which remained unheard until 1978's Mahalo from Elvis. They were not included in the original soundtrack album, but they appear on the 1998 CD reissue.

Charts

See also 
 Aloha from Hawaii via Satellite (music concert)
 Mahalo from Elvis

References

External links
 
 VPSX-6089 Aloha from Hawaii via Satellite Guide part of The Elvis Presley Record Research Database

1973 live albums
Elvis Presley live albums